Greasertown (also, Petersburg) is a former settlement in Calaveras County,  west of San Andreas, on the west side of the Calaveras River. It was a mining town during the California Gold Rush. It was destroyed when the first Hogan Dam on the Calaveras River was built in the late 1920s.

References

Former settlements in Calaveras County, California
Former populated places in California